Dino Vasso (born November 8, 1987) is an American football coach who is the cornerbacks coach for the Houston Texans of the National Football League (NFL). He was previously the assistant coordinator for defense for the Philadelphia Eagles, where he also won a Super Bowl as an assistant secondary coach. He has also been a coaching assistant for the Kansas City Chiefs as well as an intern and graduate assistant at Temple and Missouri.

Coaching career 
Vasso began his coaching career at Temple as an offensive intern in 2011, and was hired as a graduate assistant the next season at Missouri with the task of handling recruiting videos and compiling information on recruits. He was later hired as a coaching assistant with the Kansas City Chiefs in 2013 where he spent three seasons working with the Chiefs defense.

Philadelphia Eagles 
Vasso joined the Philadelphia Eagles coaching staff as a defensive quality control and assistant secondary coach under first-year head coach Doug Pederson, who he worked with in Kansas City. He won his Super Bowl with the Eagles when they defeated the New England Patriots in Super Bowl LII 41–33. Vasso was promoted to the role of assistant coordinator/defense in 2020 in a series of Eagles coaching staff shuffles.

Houston Texans 
Vasso was hired as the cornerbacks coach for the Houston Texans on March 10, 2021.

References

External links 
 Dino Vasso on Twitter
 New Hampshire Wildcats bio

1987 births
Living people
Sportspeople from Philadelphia
People from Ridley Township, Pennsylvania
Players of American football from Philadelphia
Coaches of American football from Pennsylvania
American football defensive backs
New Hampshire Wildcats football players
Temple Owls football coaches
Missouri Tigers football coaches
Kansas City Chiefs coaches
Philadelphia Eagles coaches
Houston Texans coaches